Selva is a surname. It is also an Indian given name or surname. It may refer to:

 Alberto Selva (born 1964), former Captain Regent of San Marino
 Andy Selva (born 1976), San Marino football player
 Antonio Selva (1824–1889), Italian operatic bass
 Gustavo Selva (1926–2015), Italian politician 
 Paul J. Selva (born 1958), American military officer
 Steve Selva  (born 1948), American biologist
 Vincent Selva, film director and screenwriter

See also
Selva (disambiguation)
Selva (name)

Italian-language surnames